Ichneutica moderata is a moth of the family Noctuidae. This species is endemic to New Zealand and can be found from the Bay of Plenty south including the Chatham Islands. I. moderata inhabits open spaces in lowland to montane zones. Larvae likely feed on a variety of low growing herbaceous plants including on Raoulia species. Larvae create silk covered tunnels in the roots of their host plants. Pupa are enclosed in a loose silken cocoons and are sheltered amongst the host species roots. The adult moths are on the wing from October to April.

Taxonomy 
This species was first described by Francis Walker in 1865 using specimens collected in Nelson by Mr T. R. Oxley. Walker was unsure of the genus and so named the species Agrotis? moderata. The lectotype specimen is held by the Natural History Museum, London. Rudolf Felder and Alois Friedrich Rogenhofer also described this species, thinking it new, in 1875 and named it Mamestra griseipennis. This name was synonymised with Aletia moderata by J. S. Dugdale in 1988. In 2019 Robert Hoare undertook a major review of New Zealand Noctuidae. During this review the genus Ichneutica was greatly expanded and the genus Aletia was subsumed into that genus as a synonym. As a result of this review, this species is now known as Ichneutica moderata.

Description 

Walker described this species as follows:

The adult male of the species has a wingspan of between 33 and 38 mm, the female has a wingspan of between 36 and 43 mm. This species is nondescript but can be distinguished from other similar appearing species as both the male and female have unmarked creamy white fringes on their hindwings.

Hudson described the larvae of the species as follows:

Distribution 
This species is found throughout New Zealand, including the Chatham Islands, with the only exception being the northern part of the North Island, that is Bay of Plenty north.

Habitat 
I. moderata prefers open habitats in the montane to lowlands zones.

Behaviour 
Adults of this species are on the wing from October to April.

Life history and host species 

The larvae of this species likely feed on various kinds of low growing herbaceous plants. However I. moderata larvae is recorded as being associated with Raoulia particularly the species R. australis, R. subulata and R. beauverdii as well as Crassula manaia. Larvae have also been reared on Bellis perennis. Larvae create tunnels lined with silk amongst the roots of the species' host plants. Pupa are enclosed in an insubstantial and easily damaged silken cocoon amongst the roots.

References

Hadeninae
Moths of New Zealand
Moths described in 1858
Endemic fauna of New Zealand
Taxa named by Francis Walker (entomologist)
Endemic moths of New Zealand